The Dutch Swing College Band "DSCB" is a traditional dixieland band founded on 5 May 1945 by bandleader and clarinettist/saxophonist Peter Schilperoort.

Highly successful in their native home of The Netherlands, the band quickly found an international following. It has featured such musicians as Huub Janssen (drums), Henk Bosch van Drakestein (double bass), Kees van Dorser (trumpet), Dim Kesber (saxes), Jan Morks (clarinet), Wout Steenhuis (guitar), Arie Ligthart (banjo/guitar), Jaap van Kempen (banjo/guitar), Oscar Klein (trumpet), Dick Kaart (trombone), Ray Kaart (trumpet), Bert de Kort (cornet), Bert Boeren (trombone), Rod Mason, Rob Agerbeek (piano) - among many others.

The band provided the interval act for the Eurovision Song Contest 1976 presented live from Den Haag.

The band continues to tour extensively, mainly in Europe and Scandinavia, and record directed by Bob Kaper, himself a member since 1967, following the former leader, Peter Schilperoort's death on 17 November 1990. Schilperoort had led the band for more than 45 years, albeit with a five-year sabbatical from 13 September 1955, when he left to pursue an engineering career before returning to lead the band again officially on 1 January 1960.

Line-up

Current 
As of January 2022, the line-up is:
 Keesjan Hoogeboom, trumpet, vocals
 Bert Boeren, trombone
 David Lukàcs, clarinet, soprano saxophone, tenor saxophone, baritone saxophone
 Adrie Braat, musical director, double bass
 Frits Landesbergen, drums
 Peter Kanters, banjo, guitar

Previous 
As of January 2012, the line-up is:
 Bob Kaper musical director, clarinet, altosaxophone, vocals
 Ton van Bergeijk banjo, guitar, vocals
 Keesjan Hoogeboom trumpet, vocals
 Maurits Woudenberg trombone
 Frits Kaatee clarinet, soprano saxophone, baritone saxophone
 Adrie Braat double bass
 Onno de Bruijn drums

Early 
As of the end of 1945, the line-up was:
 Frans Vink Jr leader, piano
 Peter Schilperoort clarinet, alto saxophone, baritone saxophone
 Joost van Os trumpet
 Bill Brant trombone
 Otto Gobius guitar
 Henry Frohwein double bass
 Tony Nüsser drums

Other key line-ups

Discography 
With a recording history from 1945 to the present day in 2012 many albums and singles have been recorded. Recording media from 78 rpm discs, 33 and 45 rpm records and CDs and DVDs on variety of labels, including Philips and the band's own DSC production label.

As well as recording on its own, recordings were made with a number of notable US solo artists beginning in 1951 with Sidney Bechet and continuing into the 1970s with the likes of Jimmy Witherspoon in 1970, Joe Venuti in 1971, Teddy Wilson in 1972 and 1973, Billy Butterfield in 1973, Bud Freeman in 1975 and Wild Bill Davison in 1976.

Tracks recorded over the history of the band include amongst many others "Tin Roof Blues", "Apex Blues", "Panama", "Shake Rag", "Everything's Wrong, Ain't Nothing Right", "Freeze n' Melt", "Strange Peach", Royal Garden Blues, Jazz Me Blues, High Society, Out of the Gallion, At the Jazzband Ball, That's a Plenty, Nobody Knows When You Are Down and Out, Annie Street Rock, Figety Feet, "Margie".

Note: Decca 846 761-2 The Singles Collection Volume 1, other CDs are available

Albums
 Dutch Swing College Band HOT ( Opnames van 1951-1956)
 Dutch Swing College Band (25 cm LP met 8 nummers, datum onbekend)
 Dixieland Goes Dutch (1955)
 Dutch Swing College Band with Nelson Williams (1957)
 Swing College At Home (1958)
 Jazz at the Concertgebouw A'dam feat. Neva Raphaello. (1958)
 Swinging Studio Sessions (1959)
 The Band's Best (1959, 1960)
 12 Jazz Classics (1961)
 Party Favourites (May & June 1961)
 At the Jazzband Ball (1961)
 Dixie Gone Dutch (1962)
 DSC At the European Jazz Festival (Comblain-la-Tour, Belgium 1962)
 The Dutch Swing College Band at the Sport Palast Berlin (1962)
 The Dutch Swing College Band Meets Teddy Wilson (1964)
 Dutch Swing College Band goes Latin (1964)
 20 Years DSC (Live at Sportpalast Berlin (1965)
 Live Party (Maart 1965)
 Reunion Jazz band (Sept 1966)
 When the Swing comes Marching in (1968)
 Dutch Swing College Band Meets Jimmy Witherspoon - Ain't Nobody's Business (1970)
 Dutch Swing College Band Meets Joe Venuti (1971)
 Johnny Goes Dixie (feat. Johnny Meijer) (1974}
 DSC 'Live' (1974)
 Dutch Swing College Band and Bud Freeman (1975)
 Dutch Swing College Band (1976)
 DSC Hit Collection (1977)
 'Still Blowing Strong' 34 Years (1978)
 The Dutch Swing College Band Jubilee Concert (May 1980)
 Digital Dixie (1981)
 Digital Anniversary (1985)
 Live 1974 (1997)
 The Real Thing - European City Concerts (2003)
 We Double Dare You (2004)
 The Swing Code (2005)
 Swing that Music (2006)
 When You're Smiling - with Lils Mackintosh (2007)
 My Tune - Single (2008)
 My Inspiration (2009)
 Jubilee Concert - recorded in The Hague on the occasion of the Band celebrating 65 years (2010)
 Update (2012)
 The Music Goes Round and Round - featuring Margriet Sjordsma (2014)
 When the Swing comes marching on (2015)
 LIVE! (2015)
 Candlenight Blues - Single (2016)
 The Dutch Swing College band Plays Royal Compositions of his majesty king Bhumibol Adulyadej (2016)

References

External links

 Official website
 Dutch Swing College Band playing in Germany youtube Retrieved 12-10-2007.
 'Still Swinging' - 40 minute documentary (1976).

Dixieland revival ensembles
Dutch jazz ensembles
Timeless Records artists